東, meaning "east", may refer to:
 Azuma (name), a Japanese surname and given name
 Dōng, a Chinese surname
 Dong (film), a 2006 Chinese documentary film

See also
 Higashi-ku (disambiguation), for various districts in Japan
 Dong-gu (disambiguation), for various districts in South Korea
 東山 (disambiguation) ("East Mountain")
 東海 (disambiguation) ("East Sea")